ABC was a regional news programme for Stockholm County and Uppsala County in Sweden broadcast by Sveriges Television (SVT). The programme started in 1987, making Stockholm and Uppsala the last counties in Sweden to receive regional television news.

The programme is broadcast from the SVT news studio in Stockholm and has a local office in Uppsala.

The name came from the county letters for Stockholm (AB) and Uppsala (C).

The programme was last broadcast on 11 April 2015. It was replaced by three regional news programmes: SVT Nyheter Stockholm, SVT Nyheter Uppsala and SVT Nyheter Södertälje.

Uppsala County has had its own programme called SVT Uppland since 25 August 2008.

External links
Official website

Sveriges Television original programming
Swedish television news shows